Dhankawadi was an outlying borough of the city of Pune in the state of Maharashtra.

Dhankawadi was a small village that was subsumed into Pune in 1995 and now counted into pune city. The area has been ongoing rapid building development since 2000. Part of Dhankawadi has been reserved for a bio-diversity park; however, the park remains in the proposal stage.

Dhankawadi is also a home to many of the top colleges in Pune, including Pune Institute of Computer Technology (PICT), Bharti Vidyapeeth Deemed University(BVPDU).

It also includes many local attractions like Katraj Lake which has an island with a large statue of warrior king Shivaji and a huge Rajiv Gandhi Zoological Park with a snake park and animal rescue center.

Notes

Neighbourhoods in Pune